Sianki  (Sianky) is a former village in the administrative district of Gmina Lutowiska, within Bieszczady County, Subcarpathian Voivodeship, in south-eastern Poland, on the border with Ukraine.

On the Ukrainian side of the border there is a still extant part of the village (Sianky).

References

Sianky